The Neils Hogenson home is an original catalogue order house purchased through the T. Eaton’s Co. Catalogue and built by Mr. Neils Hogensen. Shipped from Winnipeg by train, the home came to Stirling in crates with instruction, including shingles, lumber, doors, moldings, windows, paint, nails, hardware and building paper, all this for the cost of about $1,577.00. The home was paid for at the train station and hauled to the site of construction. Today the Neils Hogensen House remains on its original foundation and has become a local landmark, retaining many of the original features from the time it was constructed in 1917.

From the early 1900s to the 1930s, Eaton's sold entire houses from their catalogues to help with the population boom throughout Western Canada. The materials were shipped by rail to the nearest community, paid for at the station, and then hauled to the site for construction. Pricing for a home usually cost around $1,577.00 to $2,049.00 from 1917-1918. The total price depended on the extras to be added in. For $146.00 more you could add a "Hot Air Heating Plant" and for $180.00, a complete "Plumbing Outfit". The basement concrete and interior finishing were extra. This made building a home a quick and easier job for the settlers living throughout the prairies, where wood was scarce and supplies were short.

See also
 Kit houses in North America
 Sears Catalog Home
 List of attractions and landmarks in Stirling
 Stirling, Alberta

External links
 Maps of historic sites in Stirling
 Neils Hogenson House

Buildings and structures in the County of Warner No. 5
Buildings and structures in Stirling, Alberta
Houses completed in 1917
Houses in Alberta
Eaton's
Kit houses